Phetburi Football Club (Thai สโมสรฟุตบอลจังหวัดเพชรบุรี ) was a Thai professional football club based in Phetchaburi Province. The club played in Regional League Division 2 from 2010 until 2015.

Stadium and locations

Seasonal Record

Honours
Regional League Central-West Division
 Runner-up (1) : 2014

External links
 Official Website of Phetburi FC
 Official Facebookpage of Phetburi FC

Association football clubs established in 2010
Football clubs in Thailand
Sport in Phetchaburi province
2010 establishments in Thailand